Dawpool was a village in Cheshire, England. The village was located between Thurstaston and Caldy on the Wirral Peninsula.

References

Metropolitan Borough of Wirral
History of Cheshire